The critical reputation of the British composer Arthur Sullivan has fluctuated markedly in the 150 years since he came to prominence. At first, critics regarded him as a potentially great composer of serious masterpieces, the long-awaited great English composer. When Sullivan made a series of popular successes in comic operas with the librettist W.S. Gilbert, Victorian critics generally praised the operettas but reproached Sullivan for not concentrating on composing solemn choral works and grand opera instead. Immediately after Sullivan's death, his reputation was attacked by critics who condemned him for not taking part in what they conceived of as an "English musical renaissance". By the latter part of the 20th century, Sullivan's music was being critically reassessed, beginning with the first book devoted to a study of his music, The Music of Arthur Sullivan by Gervase Hughes (1960).

Early career

When the young Arthur Sullivan returned to England after his studies in Leipzig, critics were struck by his potential as a composer. His incidental music to The Tempest received an acclaimed premiere at the Crystal Palace on 5 April 1862. The Athenaeum wrote:

His Irish Symphony of 1866 won similarly enthusiastic praise: "The symphony...is not only by far the most noticeable composition that has proceeded from Mr. Sullivan's pen, but the best musical work, if judged only by the largeness of its form and the number of beautiful thoughts it contains, for a long time produced by any English composer." But as Arthur Jacobs notes, "The first rapturous outburst of enthusiasm for Sullivan as an orchestral composer did not last." A comment that may be taken as typical of those that would follow the composer throughout his career was that "Sullivan's unquestionable talent should make him doubly careful not to mistake popular applause for artistic appreciation."

Sullivan was also occasionally cited for a lack of diligence. For instance, of his early oratorio, The Prodigal Son, his teacher, John Goss, wrote:

Transition to opera
By the mid-1870s, Sullivan had turned his attention mainly to works for the theatre, for which he was generally admired. For instance, after the first performance of Trial by Jury (1875), the Times said that "It seems, as in the great Wagnerian operas, as though poem and music had proceeded simultaneously from one and the same brain." But serious music critics began to express disapproval. The music critic Peter Gammond writes of "misapprehensions and prejudices, delivered to our door by the Victorian firm Musical Snobs Ltd. ... frivolity and high spirits were sincerely seen as elements that could not be exhibited by anyone who was to be admitted to the sanctified society of Art." By the time The Sorcerer appeared in 1877, there were charges that Sullivan was wasting his talents in comic opera:

Implicit in these comments was the view that comic opera, no matter how carefully crafted, was an intrinsically lower form of art than oratorio. The Athenaeum's review of The Martyr of Antioch expressed a similar complaint: "It might be wished that in some portions Mr Sullivan had taken a loftier view of his theme, but at any rate he has written some most charming music, and orchestration equal, if not superior, to any that has ever proceeded from the pen of an English musician. And, further, it is an advantage to have the composer of H.M.S. Pinafore occupying himself with a worthier form of art."

The operas with Gilbert themselves, however, garnered Sullivan high praise from the theatre reviewers.  For instance, The Daily Telegraph wrote, "The composer has risen to his opportunity, and we are disposed to account Iolanthe his best effort in all the Gilbertian series." Similarly, the Theatre would say that "the music of Iolanthe is Dr Sullivan's chef d'oeuvre. The quality throughout is more even, and maintained at a higher standard, than in any of his earlier works.... In every respect Iolanthe sustains Dr Sullivan's reputation as the most spontaneous, fertile, and scholarly composer of comic opera this country has ever produced." Sullivan received honorary  doctorates of music from the University of Cambridge in 1876, and Oxford in 1879.

Knighthood and maturity

After Sullivan was knighted in 1883, serious music critics renewed the charge that the composer was squandering his talent. The Musical Review of that year wrote:

In Grove's Dictionary of Music and Musicians, Sir George Grove, who was an old friend of Sullivan's, recognised the artistry in the Savoy Operas while urging the composer to bigger and better things: "Surely the time has come when so able and experienced a master of voice, orchestra, and stage effect—master, too, of so much genuine sentiment—may apply his gifts to a serious opera on some subject of abiding human or natural interest."

The premiere of The Golden Legend at the Leeds Festival in 1886 finally brought Sullivan the acclaim for a serious work that he had previously lacked. For instance, the critic of the Daily Telegraph wrote that "a greater, more legitimate and more undoubted triumph than that of the new cantata has not been achieved within my experience." The Observer hailed it as a "triumph of English art". Similarly, Louis Engel in The World called it: "one of the greatest creations we have had for many years. Original, bold, inspired, grand in conception, in execution, in treatment, it is a composition which will make an "epoch" and which will carry the name of its composer higher on the wings of fame and glory. The effect it produced at rehearsal was enormous. The effect of the public performance was unprecedented." Hopes for a new departure were evident in the Daily Telegraph'''s review of The Yeomen of the Guard, Sullivan's most serious opera to that point:

1890s
The advance that the Daily Telegraph was looking for would come with Sullivan's only grand opera, Ivanhoe (1891), which opened to largely favourable reviews, but attracted some significant negative ones. For instance, J. A. Fuller Maitland wrote in The Times that the opera's "best portions rise so far above anything else that Sir Arthur Sullivan has given to the world, and have such force and dignity, that it is not difficult to forget the drawbacks which may be found in the want of interest in much of the choral writing, and the brevity of the concerted solo parts."  In her 1891 essay "Arthur Seymour Sullivan", Florence A. Marshall reviewed Sullivan's music up to that time, concluding that Sullivan was torn between his interests in comedy and tragedy. She wrote that he was "no dreamy idealist, but thoroughly practical ... apprehending and assimilating all the tendencies in the life of society around him, and knowing how to turn them all to account ... music is, in his hands, a plastic material, into which he can mould anything. His mastery of form and of instrumentation is absolute, and he wields them without the slightest semblance of effort. His taste is ... unerring; his perceptions of the keenest; his sense of humor infectious and irresistible."

In the 1890s, Sullivan's successes were fewer and farther between than earlier in his career. The ballet Victoria and Merrie England (1898) won praise from most critics:

After The Rose of Persia (1899), the Daily Telegraph said that "The musician is once again absolutely himself", while the Musical Times opined that "it is music that to hear once is to want to hear again and again."

In 1899, Sullivan composed a popular song, "The Absent-Minded Beggar", to a text by Rudyard Kipling, donating the proceeds of the sale to "the wives and children of soldiers and sailors" on active service in the Boer War. Fuller Maitland disapproved in The Times, but Sullivan himself asked a friend, "Did the idiot expect the words to be set in cantata form, or as a developed composition with symphonic introduction, contrapuntal treatment, etc.?"

Although the more solemn members of the musical establishment could not forgive Sullivan for writing music that was both comic and accessible, he was, nevertheless, "the nation's de facto composer laureate". Sullivan was considered the natural candidate to compose a Te Deum for the end of the Boer War, which he duly completed, despite serious ill-health; it was performed posthumously. Gian Andrea Mazzucato wrote this glowing summary of Sullivan's career in The Musical Standard of 16 December 1899:

Posthumous reputation

After Sullivan's death, Sir George Grove wrote, "Form and symmetry he seems to possess by instinct; rhythm and melody clothe everything he touches; the music shows not only sympathetic genius, but sense, judgement, proportion, and a complete absence of pedantry and pretension; while the orchestration is distinguished by a happy and original beauty hardly surpassed by the greatest masters.". His obituary in The Times called him England's "most conspicuous composer ... the musician who had such power to charm all classes. ... The critic and the student found new beauties at every fresh hearing. What ... set Sullivan in popular esteem far above all the other English composers of his day was the tunefulness of his music, that quality in it by which ... [it] was immediately recognized as a joyous contribution to the gaiety of life. ... Sullivan’s name stood as a synonym for music in England." The obituary also stated: "Many who are able to appreciate classical music regret that Sir Arthur Sullivan did not aim consistently at higher things, that he set himself to rival Offenbach and Lecocq instead of competing on a level of high seriousness with such musicians as Sir Hubert Parry and Professor Stanford. If he had followed this path, he might have enrolled his name among the great composers of all time. ... That Sir Arthur Sullivan could aim high and succeed he proved by The Golden Legend and by a good deal of Ivanhoe".

Over the next decade, however, Sullivan's reputation sank considerably among music critics. In 1901, shortly after the composer's death, Fuller Maitland took issue with the generally laudatory tone of most of the obituaries, citing the composer's failure to live up to the early praise of his Tempest music:

Edward Elgar, to whom Sullivan had been particularly kind, rose to Sullivan's defence, branding Fuller Maitland's obituary "the shady side of musical criticism ... that foul unforgettable episode." Fuller Maitland was later discredited when it was shown that he had falsified the facts, inventing a banal lyric, passing it off as genuine and condemning Sullivan for supposedly setting such inanity. In 1929 Fuller Maitland admitted that he had been wrong in earlier years to dismiss Sullivan's comic operas as "ephemeral". In his History of Music in England (1907) Ernest Walker, was even more damning of Sullivan than Fuller Maitland had been in 1901:

Fuller Maitland incorporated similar views in the second edition of Grove's Dictionary of Music and Musicians, which he edited, while Walker's History was re-issued in 1923 and 1956 with his earlier verdict intact. As late as 1966, Frank Howes, former music critic of The Times wrote:

There were other writers who rose to praise Sullivan. For example, Thomas Dunhill wrote an entire chapter of his 1928 book, Sullivan's Comic Operas, titled "Mainly in Defence", which reads in part:

Sir Henry Wood continued to perform Sullivan's serious music. In 1942 Wood presented a Sullivan centenary concert at the Royal Albert Hall, but it was not until the 1960s that Sullivan's music other than the Savoy operas began to be widely reassessed and revived.

Recent views

In 1960 Hughes published the first full-length book about Sullivan's music and picked up the trail where Dunhill left off:

In recent decades, Sullivan's work outside of the Savoy Operas has begun to be re-assessed. The work of the Sir Arthur Sullivan Society, founded in 1977, and books about Sullivan by musicians such as Young (1971) and Jacobs (1986) contributed to the re-evaluation of Sullivan's serious music. Since the late 1960s most of Sullivan's major non-Savoy music has been professionally recorded. The Symphony in E had its first professional recording in 1968; his solo piano and chamber music in 1974; the cello concerto in 1986; Kenilworth in 1999; The Martyr of Antioch in 2000; The Golden Legend in 2001. In 1992 and 1993, Naxos released four discs featuring performances of Sullivan's ballet music and his incidental music to plays. Of his operas apart from Gilbert, Cox and Box (1961 and several later recordings), The Zoo (1978), The Rose of Persia (1999), and The Contrabandista (2004) have had professional recordings.

In recent decades, several publishers have issued scholarly critical editions of Sullivan's works, including Ernst Eulenburg (The Gondoliers), Broude Brothers (Trial by Jury, H.M.S. Pinafore and Iolanthe), David Russell Hulme for Oxford University Press (Ruddigore), Robin Gordon-Powell at The Amber Ring (The Masque at Kenilworth, the Marmion overture, the Imperial March, The Contrabandista, The Prodigal Son, On Shore and Sea, Macbeth incidental music, The Beauty Stone and Ivanhoe), and R. Clyde (Cox and Box, Haddon Hall, Overture "In Memoriam", Overture di Ballo and The Golden Legend).

In 1957 a review in The Times explained Sullivan's contributions to "the continued vitality of the Savoy operas": "Gilbert's lyrics ... take on extra point and sparkle when set to Sullivan's music. ... [Sullivan, too, is] a delicate wit, whose airs have a precision, a neatness, a grace, and a flowing melody". A 2000 article in The Musical Times'' by Nigel Burton noted the resurgence of Sullivan's reputation beyond the comic operas:

Notes

Bibliography
 
 
 
 
 
 
 
 
 
 
 
 
 
 
 

Critical reputation
Gilbert and Sullivan
Music criticism